This is a list of hotels in North Korea.

Hotels in Pyongyang

Hotels in provincial cities

Hotels in Rason Special Economic Zone

See also
Tourism in North Korea

References

Works cited

External links 
 Democratic People's Republic of Korea - Service facilities

 
 Hotels in North Korea- List of hotels in North Korea

Hotels
North Korea